Calvin Thomas (born November 29, 1986) is a Canadian film director and screenwriter, who collaborates on most of his work with Yonah Lewis. The duo are most noted for their 2019 film White Lie, which was a Canadian Screen Award nominee for Best Motion Picture, and garnered the duo nominations for Best Director and Best Original Screenplay, at the 8th Canadian Screen Awards.

The duo, both alumni of Sheridan College, released their debut feature film Amy George in 2011. They followed up with The Oxbow Cure in 2013, and Spice It Up in 2018, before releasing White Lie. In addition to their Canadian Screen Award nominations, the duo also won the Vancouver Film Critics Circle award for Best Screenplay for a Canadian Film in 2019.

Filmography

References

External links

1986 births
Living people
21st-century Canadian screenwriters
Canadian male screenwriters
Film directors from Calgary
Sheridan College alumni
Writers from Calgary